Christian Kuntner (January 15, 1962 – May 18, 2005) was an Italian extreme climber. He died in May 2005 while climbing the Annapurna from North Side.

He was born in Prad Italy and grew up there. He completed his schooling at Bolzano with a major in Mechanical Engineering and started working as a freelancer.

Death 
He died on May 18, 2005 while climbing the Annapurna peak. This was the last summit for him to complete all the Eight-thousander, but couldn't make it due to an ice avalanche.

References 

Italian mountain climbers
1962 births
2005 deaths
People from Prad am Stilfser Joch